The second season of La Ferme Célébrités, French TV reality show was broadcast from 30 April 2005 to 28 June 2005 TF1. It was presented by Christophe Dechavanne and Patrice Carmouze. It was won by Jordy who won 180,000 € for the "France Parkinson" research on Parkinson's disease association.

Contestants

Nominations

La Ferme Célébrités
2005 French television seasons